The Sulawesi drongo (Dicrurus montanus) is a species of bird in the family Dicruridae. It is endemic to Sulawesi in Indonesia. Its natural habitats are subtropical or tropical moist lowland forests and subtropical or tropical moist montane forests.

References

Endemic birds of Sulawesi
Drongos
Birds described in 1919
Taxa named by Joseph Harvey Riley
Taxonomy articles created by Polbot